Tárico Caifaz Samuel Simbine known professionally as DJ Tarico, is a Mozambican record producer, beatmaker, music composer, and a sound engineer. A heavyweight producer who has become one of the global faces of Amapiano music. He describes his journey through a number of different musical genres from Afro-house, Pandza, Marrabenta, Amapiano, House, Kizomba and Afrobeats.

Tarico is best known for producing Yaba Buluku featuring Nelson Tivane, Preck and Burna Boy. He was nominated for AFRIMA 2021, AFRIMA 2022, 8th African Muzik Magazine Awards and The Headies 2022.

Music career
In 2022, DJ Tarico released his single with Yuri Da Cunha, "Abre O Canal". He also collaborated with Mr Eazi and Joey B to release Patek and it was remixed featuring Falz in 2022.

Discography

Single
Abre O Canal
Yaba Buluku
Patek

Awards and nominations

References 

Year of birth missing (living people)
Living people
Mozambican musicians